Henry Booth  (4 April 1788 – 28 March 1869) was a British corn merchant, businessman and engineer particularly known as one of the key people behind the construction and management of the pioneering Liverpool and Manchester Railway (L&M), the world's first steam railway conducting both scheduled passenger services and freight.

Biography
Henry Booth  was born in Rodney Street, Liverpool, England, a descendant of the Booths of Twemlow.  His father, Thomas, was the son of a yeoman farmer of Orford, Cheshire.  Thomas and his brother George apprenticed to corn merchant Dobson in 1767, and  1774 began business as corn factors on the own account at 17 King Street, Liverpool.  As eldest son of it was expected Henry would follow his father in that business and was sent to a Dr. Shepherd, a Presbyterian minister in the nearby village of Gateacre for instruction.  He showed an aptitude for reading books, poetry, practical mechanics and was noted for a good eye for proportion.  Henry initially found employment in his father's business before branching out with this own corn merchant business, being noted for not being particularly successful.

1820-1830 building the railway
Booth's father Thomas had been an original member of the L&M project original provisional committee in 1822.  Henry later replaced his father and quickly became noted for organisational and promotional skills and enthusiasm for the endeavour which was to an extent stalling by 1823 and least in part due to the difficulties and over-commitment of William James.  Appointed as committee secretary and noted as becoming second only to Joseph Saunders in commitment to the project Booth was one of the four members of a working party sent to visit other railways at Bedlington Ironworks, Killingworth and Hetton colliery, returning with a report recommending steam locomotive haulage for the L&M.  A meeting of 20 May 1824 accepted the report but also took the steps to forming a Joint Stock Company, Booth writing the prospectus which was issued on 29 October 1824.

1825 saw Booth give up his corn merchant interests to concentrate on the L&M project.

The original enabling act for the L&M was defeated in parliament in 1825,  George Stephenson performing badly.  Stephenson was more of a self-taught rather than formally trained civil engineer and his situation was not helped by some of his subordinate engineers who had made significant errors in the submission which were picked up on.  While Booth had requested no scapegoats were made, one of the engineers committed suicide.

The L&M used the Rennie brothers for a further submission to build the railway in 1826.  The revised presentation focused on the use of stationary engines with mobile locomotives only to be considered if their technology improved.  With focus away from locomotives and the pro-stationary engine and the Rennies involved, the enabling bill emerged from committee in late March, passed the House of Commons in early April, passed the House of Lords and received Royal assent in early May 1826.  With the bill passed, Booth, Saunders and other pro-locomotive directors replaced the Rennies recalling George Stephenson to build the railway, much to the Rennies' chagrin.

On 29 May 1826 following the achievement of the enabling act for the L&M, at a meeting of subscribers Booth was appointed treasurer at a salary of £500 a year.  He was to continue competently fulfilling the posts of Treasurer, Secretary and later General Manager for the life of the L&M.

Rainhill and Rocket
As the building of the railway continued toward conclusion the board was split as whether to use stationary engines or mobile locomotives particularly over the significant inclines around Rainhill.  Booth was in favour of locomotive haulage; however locomotives being built were mostly orientated towards freight haulage to and from mines and not for higher speed passenger work.  The single flue design used by locomotives was one of the constraints to raising steam due to the limited heating surface between the hot tubes and water in the boiler.  That this was understood was indicated by the reverse flue in Hawkworth's Royal George, the most powerful locomotive of the time, which reversed the main flue.  Booth and the L&MR board initially gave the Stephensons £100 to experiment with a multi-tube boiler, however the result was not successful.  Lancashire Witch, which was initially to have had a multi-tube boiler eventually emerged with a single main flue and two subsidiary flues.

On 20 April 1829 the board of the Liverpool and Manchester Railway project passed a resolution for a competition to be held to prove their railway could be reliably operated by steam locomotives, there being advice from eminent engineers of the age that stationary engines would be required.  A prize of £500 was offered as an incentive to the winner, with strict conditions a locomotive would need to meet to enter the trial.  Booth and the Stephensons partnered to produce a premium engine with a multi-tube boiler that was to become Stephenson's Rocket and which was to win the Rainhill Trials in October 1829.

There are suggestions it was Booth who proposed the basic design of the first multi-tubular boiler as used on Rocket, built in late 1829 for the L&M Railway.  The first record of Booth first referring to "method of producing steam without smoke", or the multi-tube boiler, occurs in the Minutes of an L&M board meeting in the Spring of 1827. Marc Seguin of France also claimed the invention as his.

1831-1845 Liverpool and Manchester operations

Booth was the company treasurer of the L&M for the whole 15 years of its operating life, the railway taking over from the Stockton and Darlington as the model to be followed.  Especially in the early pioneering years, challenges arose and had to be overcome.  Booth's contributions to the railway continued to be recognised with his salary being increased from £750 to £1,000 in 1834 and four years later to £1,500.  Even though treasurer, Booth made some technical contributions to the railway including lubrication of certain parts of locomotives using grease rather than oil.  Booth is also connected with the use of buffers for the coach rolling stock, even having to account to parliament on the matter in 1832 and introducing and devised an arrangement with an additional set of springs with double hanging shackles for first class coaches. 

Booth was a leading proponent of working all British railways to one standard time.

After the merger

On the formation of the London & North Western Railway (LNWR) on 16 July 1846, he became a director of the new large company, serving until 18 May 1859. He also served as the company secretary for the LNWR's Northern Division for a year, being the first person to do so.

Inventions
Booth is credited with the invention of the screw coupling, with a statue of him holding one displayed in St George's Hall, Liverpool.

Notes

References

Bibliography

Further reading

  CN 8983
 

1788 births
1869 deaths
English engineers
Businesspeople from Liverpool
19th-century British businesspeople